Der Adler (literally "The Eagle") was a biweekly Nazi propaganda magazine published by the Scherl Verlag, founded by August Scherl, with the support of the Luftwaffe High Command. From 1939 to 1944, 146 magazine issues were published in total. Each magazine had 24 to 36 pages, but the amount of pages was reduced to 12 when the fall of Nazi Germany was near.

See also
 Signal - Army equivalent
 Kriegsmarine - German Navy equivalent
 Die Wehrmacht - Covering all the armed services

References

 Sidney L. Mayer, Masama Tokoi (1978): Der Adler. Eine Auswahl aus der Illustrierten der Luftwaffe 1939–1944. Stuttgart, Germany: Motorbuch-Verlag. .

Further reading
 

1939 establishments in Germany
1944 disestablishments in Germany
Biweekly magazines published in Germany
Defunct political magazines published in Germany
Luftwaffe
Magazines established in 1939
Magazines disestablished in 1944
Nazi newspapers
Propaganda newspapers and magazines
Aviation magazines
Multilingual magazines